Quanzhou County  is a county in the northeast of Guangxi, China, bordering Hunan province to the north and east. It is under the administration of Guilin City. Quanzhou is the biggest county in Guilin both in size and in population. The dialect here belongs to the Xiang Chinese.

Historically, Quanzhou was under the administration of Hunan Province. It was only after Ming Dynasty (1368CE - 1644CE) that it was removed from Hunan into Guangxi.

Administrative divisions 
Quanzhou County administers 15 towns, 1 township, and 2 ethnic townships.

Towns 
The county administers the following 15 towns:

 Quanzhou

Township and ethnic townships 

Demographics

Language 
Four Yao languages are spoken by the Yao people of Quanzhou County:
Mien
Kim Mun
Ao Min
Biao Min
Within Quanzhou County, the Biao Min language is divided into the following five different dialect groups:

 The Qingshui, Zhuwu, Shangtang, Xiaoheping, Huangladong, Huanglong, and Leigongyan group
 The Baizhu, Jingrong, and Daping group
 The Bailing, Liuzijie, and Shijianping group
 The Gumu group
 The Xieshui group

Much of the difference between local Biao Min dialects is in phonetics, rather than vocabulary. With the exception of the Xieshui dialect group, the dialect groups are largely mutually intelligible. A possible explanation for the divergence of the Xieshui dialect group with other Biao Min dialects is increased interaction with Han people in the area.

Ethnicity 

Dongshan Yao Ethnic Township is home to the largest Yao population in the county, comprising about 20,000 people across 4,800 households.

The second largest concentration is located in Jiaojiang Yao Ethnic Township, where about 1,900 ethnic Yao reside across 400 households. Within Jiaojiang, Banyaoshan Village is home to about 120 ethnic Yao, residing across 20 households.

While not an ethnic township, the town of  also has a sizable Yao community, numbering about 900 people across 190 households. Within Shaoshui, Tongyou Village hosts about 200 ethnic Yao across 60 households.

Climate

See also 

 Biao Min language
 Yao people

References

 
Counties of Guangxi
Administrative divisions of Guilin